Budimir may refer to:

Masculine given name of Slavic origin 
Budimir Đukić (born 1977), Serbian footballer
Budimir Janošević (born 1989), Serbian football goalkeeper
Budimir Jolović (born 1959), Macedonian-Serbian basketball player
Budimir Lončar (born 1924), Croatian politician
Budimir Metalnikov (1925-2005), Russian screenwriter and film director
Budimir Šegrt (born 1956), Montenegrin doctor and politician
Budimir Vujačić (born 1964), Montenegrin footballer

Surname 
Ante Budimir (born 1991), Croatian footballer
Dennis Budimir (1938–2023), American musician
Marijan Budimir (born 1980), Croatian footballer
Mario Budimir (born 1986), Croatian footballer
Milan Budimir (1891-1975), Serbian professor
Živko Budimir (born 1962), politician from Bosnia and Herzegovina

Human settlement 
Budimir, Croatia, a village near Trilj, Croatia

See also
Budimirci

Slavic masculine given names
Serbian masculine given names
Russian masculine given names
Croatian surnames
Serbian surnames